Marie Joséphine Nicolas (1845 – 1903) was a French painter.

Nicolas was born in Villers-Cotterêts, Aisne and was also known as Marie Nicholas or Marie Joséphine Drapier. She was a pupil of Levasseur and Charles Joshua Chaplin and is known for portraits and genre works. She first showed work at the Paris Salon in 1867 and her 1882 work Father Ricard was included in the book Women Painters of the World. Her self-portrait is preserved in the local museum of her hometown.

Selected works 
Self Portrait (1871)

Father Ricard (1882)

Fillette en prière

Jeune Bretonne et sa poupée (1889)

References

External links

1845 births
1903 deaths
People from Aisne
French women painters
19th-century French painters
19th-century French women artists